Fake Fiction (Chinese: 摩登年代) is a 2013 comedy-drama film directed by Shao Xiaoli and starring Xu Zheng and Zhang Zifeng.

Cast
 Xu Zheng
 Zhang Zifeng
 Vanessa Wang
 Zhang Songwen
 Chopstick Brothers (Xiao Yang & Wang Taili)
 Yue Xiaojun
 Du Peng

References

Chinese comedy-drama films